The 17th Seiyu Awards was held on March 11, 2023, at the JOQR Media Plus Hall in Minato, Tokyo. The winners of the Merit Awards, the Kei Tomiyama Award, the Kazue Takahashi Award, and the Synergy Award were announced on February 21, 2023. The rest of the winners were announced on the ceremony day. Starting this year, "Best Lead Voice Actor," "Best Supporting Voice Actor," and "New Voice Actor" will no longer be separated by gender.

Not awarded 
These awards were not given and were listed as N/A on their website.
 Personality Award
 Game Award

References

External links 
  at Seiyu Awards 

Seiyu Awards ceremonies
Seiyu
Seiyu
March 2023 events in Japan
2022 in Japanese cinema
Seiyu